Relick Sunday (or Relic Sunday) is a moveable feast in the Christian calendar celebrated in mid July on the third Sunday after Midsummer's day. The feast celebrated Christian relics of all kinds, in which offerings were given to relics.

A second usage of the term used in medieval times occurred across England, persisting most notably in Northamptonshire, when the Sunday after the feast of Saint Thomas Becket (29 December) was commonly known as Relick Sunday. This meant that it was celebrated annually between 30 December and 5 January.

A manuscript from the late fifteenth century carrying a sermon entitled In festo Reliquarum describes its commemoration:

"Worshipfull frendis, on Sunday next commyng shall be the holy fest of all relykis (called Relike Sonday), which that be left here in erth to the grete magnificence, honour and worship of god and profite to man bothe bodily and gostily, for in as much as we be in sufficient to worship and reuerence singulerly all reuerent Relikis of all seyntis left here in erth, for it passith mannis power. Wherefore holy Chirch in especiall the Chirch of Yngelonde hathe ordeynd this holy Fest to be worshipped the next Sonday aftir the translacion of seint Thomas of Cauntirbery yerely to be hallowed and had in reuerence."

References

Christian Sunday observances
July observances